is a 1980 Japanese film directed by Yoji Yamada.

Cast
Ken Takakura as Kōsaku Tajima
Chieko Baisho as Tamiko Kazami
Hidetaka Yoshioka as Takeshi Kazami
Tetsuya Takeda
Hajime Hana
Masanori Hata
Mizuho Suzuki
 Tappie Shimokawa
Kiyoshi Atsumi

Awards and nominations
5th Hochi Film Award 
 Won: Best Actress - Chieko Baisho

Reception 
The Japanese filmmaker Akira Kurosawa cited A Distant Cry from Spring as one of his 100 favorite films.

References

External links
 

1980 films
Films directed by Yoji Yamada
1980s Japanese-language films
Films with screenplays by Yôji Yamada
1980s Japanese films